Norman Albert Maurer (May 13, 1926 – November 23, 1986) was a comic book artist and writer, and a director and producer of films and television shows.

Comic books
Maurer's lifelong association with the Three Stooges began about the time of his marriage to Joan Howard, the daughter of the comedy team's Moe Howard on June 29, 1947. In 1949, he produced two Three Stooges comic book issues for Jubilee, based on the short films the team was making for Columbia Pictures. In 1953, Maurer created the first 3-D comics, Three-Dimension Comics featuring Mighty Mouse, with his brother, Leonard Maurer, and Joe Kubert. Two three-dimensional Stooge comics were also issued in 1953. He returned to the Stooges in comic form in 1972 with Gold Key Comics' The Little Stooges, which ran for seven issues over the next two years.

Films
Maurer was associate producer of Space Master X-7 (1958), in which his father-in-law, Moe, had a minor role, and is credited with the creation of the CineMagic process used in the 1960 film The Angry Red Planet.

Along with Moe, Maurer co-managed the Three Stooges after Columbia terminated their employment in 1957, and has credits in most of their later feature films. He produced The Three Stooges Scrapbook (1960), and wrote the screen stories and produced The Three Stooges Meet Hercules (1962), The Three Stooges in Orbit (1962), The Three Stooges Go Around the World in a Daze (1963) and The Outlaws Is Coming! (1965), the last two of which he also directed.

Maurer's son, Jeffrey Scott (Moe's grandson), can be seen in The Outlaws IS Coming!, credited as Jeffrey Alan, and The Three Stooges Go Around the World in a Daze in the role of Timmy, credited as Geoffrey A. Maurer.  Maurer himself can also be seen on camera as a TV cameraman in The Three Stooges Scrapbook and as a camper in 1970's Kook's Tour, which he also directed. Kook's Tour was intended to be a comedy-travelogue television series featuring the Stooges, but Larry Fine suffered a stroke during production of the pilot episode and the series was cancelled; several years later, Maurer edited together a 50-minute version of Kook's Tour using available footage from the pilot and released it to the then-booming Super 8 home movie market.

Animation
Maurer was executive producer of the 39 live-action segments used to introduce and follow Cambria Studios' syndicated The New Three Stooges cartoons (1965–1966).

He later became associated with Hanna-Barbera, working as a writer on their The New Scooby-Doo Movies (1972), Speed Buggy (1973), The Scooby-Doo/Dynomutt Hour (1976), and season one of The Richie Rich Show.  In 1977 he was working on the Hanna-Barbera cartoon "The All New Super Friends Hour", and he is credited as being the creator of the characters The Wonder Twins.. He also created and was the executive producer of their 1978 series, The Three Robonic Stooges. Maurer's sons, Jeffrey Scott and Michael Maurer also have prolific careers as TV cartoon writers.

Death
Busy until the end, Maurer died of cancer on November 23, 1986, in Los Angeles. His entombment was at Hillside Memorial Park Cemetery.

References

External links
Norman Maurer at lambiek.net

Leonard Maurer: 3-D Comics Pioneer

1926 births
1986 deaths
American comics artists
Hanna-Barbera people
Deaths from cancer in California
Burials at Hillside Memorial Park Cemetery
Artists from New York City
American male artists
American animated film directors
American animated film producers
Animation screenwriters
Television producers from New York City
American television directors
Film producers from New York (state)
Screenwriters from New York (state)
Writers from New York City
20th-century American screenwriters